Pessosaurus is an extinct genus of ichthyosaurs which existed during the Middle Triassic period.

There are two species:
 Pessosaurus polaris Hulke, 1873
 Pessosaurus suevicus Huene, 1916

See also
 List of ichthyosaurs
 Timeline of ichthyosaur research

References

Middle Triassic ichthyosaurs
Taxa named by Carl Wiman
Fossil taxa described in 1910
Ichthyosauromorph genera